Indianola Records is an American independent record label that mainly focuses on hardcore punk.

Overview
Indianola Records was founded in 1999, with the release of Life Before's "Reflections on Tomorrow". The label quickly gained worldwide recognition in 2001 with the release of Evergreen Terrace's Losing All Hope Is Freedom and subsequent releases. Indianola is run by its two active owners, John Giddens and Matt Shelton.

Early history
Originally envisioned as a studio and record label; Matt Shelton, Bo Barber, Michael Gibbs and Jeff Davis built a small studio into a family farm house of Shelton's in 1998. During this time they did demos for several Valdosta, Georgia bands under the name Black and Blue Studios, one of these bands was Life Before, an early wave melodic hardcore band fronted by John Giddens and guitarist Judson Parker (also of Cinema, Another Dying Friend, and French Connection fame). The demo, simply entitled "Summer Demo", quickly led to ramping up the record label side of the idea, with Giddens and Shelton wanting to put out a full-length record for Life Before.

Geographically, the farm house was located on a stretch of family land that had been in Shelton's family since the Civil War, it was called Indianola. With the Life Before project gearing up, a name for the record label was needed and Indianola Records was chosen. During this time, the studio side of the project was abandoned and Indianola Records released 3 albums: Life Before "Reflections on Tomorrow", Wisenbaker "Contemplating Whether or Not to Tell You, I Love You" and a compilation of artists entitled "Somewhere Between Glory and Despair". John Giddens became heavily involved with these releases and was made a co-owner. Two demo tracks from Evergreen Terrace appeared on "Somewhere Between Glory and Depair".

Exclusive distribution
With the release of Losing All Hope Is Freedom and the Evergreen Terrace vs. xOne Fifthx albums by Evergreen Terrace, along with records from A Jealousy Issue, Sleeping by the Riverside and This Runs Through, Indianola Records reached an exclusive distribution agreement with Lumberjack Distribution. "A Tragedy in Progress" by Across Five Aprils was the label's first exclusive release.

This period saw the release of such bands as A Day to Remember, Across Five Aprils, Casey Jones, Glory of This, Life in Your Way, Odd Project and many more.
Michael Gibbs and Bo Barber left active participation with the label during this time to pursue other career goals, Jeff Davis died, Sleeping by the Riverside's A Breath Between Battles is dedicated to him.

By the end of 2007, John Giddens struck a distribution deal with Koch Distribution. Koch was later sold and rebranded as E1 Entertainment One, Indianola is currently distributed by E1.

Roster

Alumni

A Day to Remember (Fueled By Ramen)
A Jealousy Issue (ex-members of Poison the Well; disbanded)
A Prisoners Dilemma
A Tragedy in Progress [original Across Five Aprils line-up]
Acirema
Across Five Aprils (Victory Records; disbanded)
And Then There Was You
Apparitions
Bombshell 
Boys No Good [members of Casey Jones]
Caldwell
Casey Jones (members of Evergreen Terrace and Loma Prieta)
Evergreen Terrace (currently on Rise Records)
Forgiven Rival
Glory of This [(Disbanded) Related Artists – Ambush!, Young Hollywood]
Gunmetal Grey (disbanded, vocalist now in Suicide Silence, ex-All Shall Perish)
HeartCakeParty
Honour Crest (Disbanded)
Life Before (the first Indianola band)
Life in Your Way (Come&Live)
Lokyata
Monday in London
Mercury Switch
Odd Project (disbanded)
Oh, Manhattan
Provoke, Destroy
Scream Out Loud (currently on Luxor Records)
Sleeping by the Riverside
Strateia
The Year Ends In Arson
This Day Will Tell
This Runs Through (disbanded, members currently in Underoath and To Speak of Wolves)
The Midnight Life
We Are Action
Wealth In Water
When Cities Sleep
Words Like Daggers (currently on Third String Records)
Your Eyes My Dreams

See also
:Category:Indianola Records albums

References

 
American independent record labels
Record labels established in 2001
Heavy metal record labels
Hardcore record labels
Punk record labels